Born to Roll is the third studio album by the Canadian country music singer-songwriter Johnny Reid. It was released on March 15, 2005, by Open Road Recordings. "You Still Own Me", "Sixty to Zero", "Missing an Angel", "Time Flies" and "Gypsy in My Soul" were released as singles.

Track listing
"She Calls Me Home" (Adrienne Follesé, Keith Follesé, Johnny Reid) – 4:46
"You Still Own Me" (Philip Douglas, Noah Gordon, Reid) – 3:40
"Sixty to Zero" (Reid, Jeremy Stover, Kim Tribble) – 3:53
"Missing an Angel" (Craig Headen, Reid) – 4:07
"I Promise You" (Reid, Stover) – 4:30
"Here I Am" (Brent Maher, Stover) – 4:08
"Gypsy in My Soul" (Tammy Hyler, Reid, Tribble) – 2:52
"You Turned It Up" (Wade Kirby, Reid, Tribble) – 3:03
"Wish It Was" (Reid) – 3:38
"Still Talkin' 'Bout You" (James House, Reid, Nick Trevisick) – 3:48
"Time Flies" (Frank McKinlay, Cyril Rawson, Reid) – 4:13
"Born to Roll" (Reid, Stover) – 4:11

Personnel
 Richard "Spady" Brannan – bass guitar
 Steve Brewster – drums, percussion
 Tom Bukovac – electric guitar
 Larry Franklin – fiddle, mandolin
 Noah Gordon – background vocals
 Tommy Harden – drums
 Tony Harrell – accordion, Hammond B-3 organ, piano, synthesizer strings
 Doug Kahan – bass guitar
 Yvan Petit – electric guitar
 Johnny Reid – acoustic guitar, piano, lead vocals, background vocals
 Michael Spriggs – acoustic guitar
 Russell Terrell – background vocals
 Jonathan Yudkin – fiddle, mandolin

External links
[ allmusic ((( Born to Roll > Overview )))]

2005 albums
Johnny Reid albums
Open Road Recordings albums
Albums produced by Jeremy Stover